Broken Windows, Empty Hallways is the tenth album led by saxophonist Houston Person which was recorded in 1972 and released on the Prestige label.

Reception

Ronnie D. Lankford, Jr. of Allmusic stated, "Broken Windows, Empty Hallways is finally an album for people who like jazzy sounding instrumentals, but don't really like jazz".

Track listing 
All compositions by Houston Person except where noted.
 "I Think It's Going to Rain Today" (Randy Newman) – 5:53   
 "Don't Mess with Bill" (Smokey Robinson) – 3:00   
 "Everything's Alright" (Tim Rice, Andrew Lloyd Webber) – 4:18   
 "Mr. Bojangles" (Jerry Jeff Walker) – 3:52   
 "Moan Er-uh Lisa" – 6:11   
 "Imagine" (John Lennon) – 3:52   
 "Let's Call This" (Thelonious Monk) – 4:03   
 "Bleeker Street" – 4:03

Personnel 
Houston Person – tenor saxophone
Victor Paz, Joe Wilder – trumpet
Jim Buffington – French horn
Hubert Laws – flute
Ronnie Jannelli – flute, clarinet, baritone saxophone
Buzz Brauner – tenor saxophone, baritone saxophone, English horn, oboe, piccolo flute, flute, clarinet
Cedar Walton – piano
Joe Beck – guitar
Ernie Hayes (tracks 1-7), Jimmy Watson (track 8) – organ 
Grady Tate – drums
Buddy Caldwell – congas [1,3]
Bunny Briggs – tap dance (track 4)
Billy Ver Planck – arranger, conductor

References 

1972 albums
Houston Person albums
Prestige Records albums
Albums produced by Ozzie Cadena
Albums recorded at Van Gelder Studio